Apolonia (minor planet designation: 358 Apolonia) is a large Main belt asteroid. It was discovered by Auguste Charlois on 8 March 1893 in Nice.

References

External links 
 
 

000358
Discoveries by Auguste Charlois
Named minor planets
000358
18930308